Theodorus of Samos was a 6th-century BC ancient Greek sculptor and  architect from the Greek island of Samos. Along with Rhoecus, he was often credited with the invention of ore smelting and, according to Pausanias, the craft of casting. He is also credited with inventing a water level, a carpenter's square, and, according to Pliny, a lock and key and the turning lathe. According to Vitruvius (vii, introduction), Theodorus is the architect of the Doric order temple Heraion of Samos temple. In some texts he is described, above all, as a great artist and in some statues he is depicted as a great inventor.

The ancient historian Herodotus twice refers to Theodorus as "the son of Telecles," a Samian artist.  Herodotus credits Theodorus along with Rhoecus with improving the process of mixing copper and tin to form bronze, as well as being the first to use it in casting.  Elsewhere, he credits Theodorus alone for discovering the art of fusing iron and using it to cast statues.

Carl Sagan, in the episode "The Backbone of Night" from his series Cosmos, states that Theodorus is credited with inventing the level, the ruler, the key, the square, the lathe, and bronze casting.

Theodorus wrote a now lost book on the Third Temple of Hera at Samos, the earliest architectural treatise of which we have the name.

References

6th-century BC births
6th-century BC deaths
Ancient Samians
6th-century BC Greek sculptors
Ancient Greek sculptors
Ancient Greek architects
Ancient Greek inventors
6th-century BC architects